Kanaka Srinivasan is an Indian classical dancer and one of the leading exponents of the classical dance form of Bharat Natyam. She is a disciple of Vazhuvoor B. Ramaiyah Pillai and is aligned with Vazhuvur tradition of the dance form. She is a recipient of the Sangeet Natak Akademi Award of 1998. The Government of India awarded her the fourth highest civilian honour of the Padma Shri, in 2006, for her contributions to Indian classical dance.

See also 
 Vazhuvoor
 Vazhuvoor B. Ramaiyah Pillai

References

External links 
 
 
 
 

Recipients of the Padma Shri in arts
Year of birth missing (living people)
Indian classical choreographers
Indian female classical dancers
Bharatanatyam exponents
Recipients of the Sangeet Natak Akademi Award
Living people
Performers of Indian classical dance
Place of birth missing (living people)
Indian women choreographers
Indian choreographers
20th-century Indian dancers
20th-century Indian women artists